Keith Puccinelli (May 5, 1950 – September 18, 2017 in San Jose, California) was an American artist based in Ventura, California. He created drawings, sculptures, and interactive installations.

Puccinelli received his BFA degree from San Jose State University in 1973.  He opened Puccinelli Design in 1983, and enjoyed a 20-year period of national and international recognition for his work in design, illustration, and advertising.  Over the past 30 years, Puccinelli has exhibited works on paper and multi-media installations in the Southern California area, and his work is included in many private collections.
His most recent exhibition, The Wondercommon, appears at Ben Maltz Gallery, OTIS College of Art and Design, Los Angeles, CA, April 19 – July 3, 2008.

His work 
Working in the vein of Jeffrey Vallance, Michael C. McMillen, Jim Shaw, and Robbie Conal, Puccinelli uses an irreverent quick wit, modest materials, and tableaux to broach the conflict between the preciousness of life and man’s disregard for life during times of war to create a kind of carnival of sorrow. The strong juxtaposition of materials and a passion for wordplay often brings a sense of humor to glaze or emphasize the serious or tragic presented in the work.
His most recent work is featured in a solo exhibition titled The Wondercommon at Ben Maltz Gallery, Otis College of Art and Design, April 19 – July 3, 2008. The exhibition includes a new body of drawings, sculptures, and an interactive installation called “The Morgue.” The title of the exhibition, The Wondercommon, combines two seemingly opposite ideas into one and refers in part to the artist’s use of common materials and tinkering techniques to evoke a sense of wonder or the wonderful. Simple pen and ink drawings on paper and sculptures are made out of everyday materials like twigs, leaves, shoes, pipe, glue, house paint, varnish, mud, and bone. The title is also a direct reference to the German word wunderkammer or a “cabinet of curiosities,” which is the genesis of museums as we know them today.

“For many years, Puccinelli has used the image of the clown in his work as an alter ego because he has ancestral links to the 16th-century Italian commedia dell’arte. This internationally popular improvisational form of street theater had a set roster of exaggerated characters who wore masks, were acrobats and jugglers—the precursors to modern day clowns. “Pulcinella” is a stock trickster character whose name was anglicized to “Punchinello” and in England transformed into the infamous “Punch” of “Punch and Judy.” Pulcinella is often portrayed as a freak with some kind of physical deformity like a hump or a limp, has limited speech, and is cunning and unruly. This satirical type of theater wove conventional story plots with local events or political scandals of the day to make their audiences laugh at the current state of affairs. Exaggeration, distortion, hyperbole, double entendre and word play are their tools and Puccinelli applies them often in his art. He tends to make us laugh or snicker first at the absurdity of the image before we do the double take and see the seriousness of the commentary.” -- Meg Linton, from Keith Puccinelli: The Wondercommon, 2008

Exhibitions 
Selected Solo and Group Exhibition from the Last Ten Years
2018   "Selected works" solo exhibition, AD&A Museum, University of California, Santa Barbara
2008	“The Wondercommon” solo exhibition, Ben Maltz Gallery, Otis College of Art and Design, Los Angeles
2007	“Sonotube” group invitational, Santa Barbara Contemporary Arts Forum
2005	“Drawing,  Advanced” 4-person exhibition, Santa Barbara City College Atkinson Gallery
2005	“Fragments” 3-person exhibition, domestic setting, Los Angeles
2004	“Humoring Inklings” 3-person exhibition, Santa Barbara Contemporary Arts Forum
2004	“Pretty Vase” group exhibition, Sullivan Goss, Santa Barbara
2004	“Oh, just passing through” group exhibition, Blur @ Bekins, Santa Barbara
2003	“Sex Show” group exhibition, Monlleo Gallery, Santa Barbara
2002	“Lucky is again” solo exhibition, Puccinelli Studio, Ventura County
2001	“Artistic Pairings” group exhibition, Patricia Correia Gallery, Santa Monica
2000	“whadda buncha clowns” solo exhibition, SBCAF blue wall at Alias Wavefront
2000	“Portraits New Millennium” group exhibition, Santa Barbara Contemporary Arts Forum
2000	“First Night Sculpture”	solo installation, City of Santa Barbara, de la Guerra Plaza
1999	“Mass TransArt”	7-person installation, UC Santa Barbara Art Museum
1998	“Artists Collect” group exhibition, Santa Barbara Contemporary Arts Forum
1998	“PAWS” guerrilla installation, SB City Parking Lot #5
1998	“Il Kaboom Grosso” 2-person installation, big, Santa Barbara

Books
Meg Linton, Keith Puccinelli: The Wondercommon, (Ben Maltz Gallery, Otis College of Art and Design, 2008.)

References

External links
Ben Maltz Gallery – The Wondercommon exhibition page http://www.otis.edu/benmaltzgallery
 
YouTube - Tour of The Wondercommon with the artist and the curator https://www.youtube.com/watch?v=xcHtBffHGqA

YouTube – Keith Puccinelli lecture at Otis College of Art and Design https://www.youtube.com/watch?v=sznMQlekhbE&feature=user

Other links
 https://web.archive.org/web/20080828170713/http://www.uam.ucsb.edu/Pages/bus_freezer_dtl.html
 https://web.archive.org/web/20081123043913/http://designarchives.aiga.org/entry.cfm/eid_4455
 https://web.archive.org/web/20110718092917/http://emilymay.wordpress.com/2007/10/23/how-to-use-a-sonotube-review-of-the-sbcaf-exhibition/
 http://www.ia.ucsb.edu/pa/display.aspx?pkey=285
 http://www.sbcc.edu/art/website/gallery2/main.php?g2_itemId=1361
 https://web.archive.org/web/20080705015941/http://www.pasadenaartalliance.org/grantees/benmaltz2008.html
 http://www.coastalview.com/obituaries/keith-julius-puccinelli/article_02342b0e-aa11-11e7-b31d-ff4c9bdfc2c9.html

1950 births
2017 deaths
Artists from San Jose, California
San Jose State University alumni
Sculptors from California